Damville Lake is a freshwater body of the Rivière-Mistassini, unorganized territory of the Maria-Chapdelaine Regional County Municipality, north-west of Saguenay-Lac-Saint-Jean administrative region, in province of Quebec, Canada.

Forestry is the main economic activity of the sector. Recreational tourism activities come second.

Some secondary forest roads serve the vicinity of the lake; these forest roads are mainly attached to the forest road R0202 which runs along the west shore of the lake.

Geography 
The "Black Spruce Mountain" is located on the east side of the lake. This lake has seven large bays. This lake is mainly fed by a stream (coming from the north), by the outlet (coming from the north) from Clair, Long and Éric lakes, as well as the outlet (coming from the southeast) from several lakes.

The mouth of Lake Damville is located at:
 north-east of the forest road R0202;
 north-east of the course of Ashuapmushuan River;
 north-eaest of down-town of Saint-Félicien.

The main hydrographic slopes near Lake Damville are:
North side: Micosas River, décharge du Lac des Îles;
East side: Micosas River, rivière aux Rognons;
South side: Ashuapmushuan River;
West side: Marquette River West, Kanishushteu River.

Toponymy
The term "Damville" refers to an old French commune in the Eure department in the Normandy region.

The toponym "Lac Ashuapmushuan" was formalized on June 18, 1993, by the Commission de toponymie du Québec.

See also 

List of lakes in Canada

Notes and references 

Lakes of Saguenay–Lac-Saint-Jean
Maria-Chapdelaine Regional County Municipality